The Kite Museum is a museum about kites in Pasir Gudang, Johor Bahru District, Johor, Malaysia.

History
The museum was established in February 2002 during the 7th Pasir Gudang International Kite Festsival.

Architecture
The museum is housed in a two-story building. It features a small windmill to generate its own electricity.

Exhibitions
The museum showcases various types of kites, posters and videos on Pasir Gudang International Kite Festival.

See also
 List of museums in Malaysia

References

External links

 

2002 establishments in Malaysia
Kite museums
Museums in Johor
Museums established in 2002
Pasir Gudang